The Monuments to the Warsaw Uprising were first established in Warsaw in the 1970s. Prior to that, there were only monuments to the Red Army soldiers and the Armia Ludowa soldiers. The role of the latter in the city fights in 1944 was exaggerated and overrated. Most of the victims of the Uprising who were buried in graves all over the city were later exhumed and buried in mass graves far away from the city centre, with a small concrete monument to "the victims of the war with Nazism". No mention of the Uprising was allowed.

Despite communist efforts, the people of Warsaw did not forget the Uprising. The only way to express it was on Polish zaduszki day, when thousands of people lit candles on graves of the Armia Krajowa soldiers in Powązki cemetery. According to the Polish secret police, in 1983 more than 400,000 people attended the informal feast. In 1979, the first (unofficial) celebration of Warsaw Uprising anniversary took place.

In the 1970s, the Polish United Workers' Party under the lead of Edward Gierek started to seek a "Polish way to socialism" and allowed for some liberalization of Polish history. The official propaganda started to underline that although the commanders of the Armia Krajowa were criminals, the individual soldiers simply followed wrong orders. In Warsaw, some 500 stone tablets were erected to commemorate those who fell in the city during the war. The tablets were all identical, except for the dates and number of victims. The text under the monuments says: This place is sanctified with the blood of Poles who fell in fight for the freedom of the Motherland. Still no mention of the Uprising was allowed in public places.

Also, a monument to the engineers of the Soviet-backed 1st Polish Army who crossed the river in late September and tried to help the Uprising was erected in Powiśle area. However, there was no text explaining when or what for did they die. The text written on the tables around the statue of an engineer said The Free Warsaw will never forget those who started the great effort of its reconstruction (...) to the engineers who lost their lives on duty..

In 1980, the start of the Solidarity movement allowed for a committee to be created, whose purpose was to erect a monument of the Warsaw Uprising. The money was to be gathered from private sponsors since the party still did not want to participate in such an initiative. Many prominent members of the Solidarity joined the committee, but it was banned after the Martial Law was imposed in 1981. However, the communist authorities understood that the memory of the Uprising will not fade in peoples' minds and agreed to prepare a project of the monument. On July 20, 1984, an erection act was prepared. The date was chosen to blur the connection with the uprising and the feast was officially connected to July 22, the anniversary of signing the PKWN manifesto. No Armia Krajowa members were invited and the construction never started.

After the peaceful dissolution of communist system in Poland in 1989, the committee was recreated. The project by Jacek Budyna was already prepared and construction begun immediately. The Warsaw Uprising Monument (Pomnik Powstania Warszawskiego) was erected on Krasiński Square, close to the place where one of the sewer communication lines with Starówka, Żoliborz and the city centre was located. The monument was revealed on August 1, 1989.

Since the beginning of the 1990s, the monuments to the soldiers who fought in the battle were no longer banned and started to spread throughout the city. Nowadays every battalion who took part in the struggle has got a monument, a street or a square named after.

See also
 Monument to victims of the Massacre of the Wola (2004), commemorating the Wola massacre, a massacre of the population of Warsaw's Wola district by the Germans in the early days of the Warsaw Uprising.
Kanał,  a Polish film released in 1956, directed by Andrzej Wajda about evacuation the defenders of the Old Town withdrew through the sewers
Powstanie Warszawskie, a concept album of an art rock band Lao Che
Red Plague, Red Plague a poem

Warsaw Uprising